The 2014 Crédit Agricole Suisse Open Gstaad was a men's tennis tournament played on outdoor clay courts. It was the 47th edition of the Swiss Open, and was part of the ATP World Tour 250 Series of the 2014 ATP World Tour. It took place at the Roy Emerson Arena in Gstaad, Switzerland, from 21 July through 27 July 2014. Pablo Andújar won the singles title.

Singles main draw entrants

Seeds 

 1 Rankings are as of July 14, 2014

Other entrants 
The following players received wildcards into the singles main draw:
  Henri Laaksonen
  Yann Marti
  Viktor Troicki

The following players received entry from the qualifying draw:
  Iñigo Cervantes
  Fabiano de Paula
  Gerald Melzer
  Gianni Mina

Withdrawals 
Before the tournament
  Nicolás Almagro
  Roberto Bautista Agut
  Łukasz Kubot
  Feliciano López
  Stéphane Robert
  Stan Wawrinka

Retirements 
  Andreas Haider-Maurer
  Gilles Simon

Doubles main draw entrants

Seeds 

 Rankings are as of July 14, 2014

Other entrants 
The following pairs received wildcards into the doubles main draw:
  Adrien Bossel /  Michael Lammer
  Henri Laaksonen /  Yann Marti

Final

Singles 

  Pablo Andújar defeated  Juan Mónaco, 6–3, 7–5

Doubles 

  Andre Begemann /  Robin Haase defeated  Rameez Junaid /  Michal Mertiňák, 6–3, 6–4

External links 
 Official website

Credit Agricole Suisse Open Gstaad
Swiss Open (tennis)
2014 Crédit Agricole Suisse Open Gstaad